Baul or Bauls are a group of mystic minstrels from Bengal, which includes the country of Bangladesh and the Indian State of West Bengal. Lalon is regarded as the most important poet-practitioner of the Baul tradition.  Baul music had a great influence on Rabindranath Tagore's poetry and on his music (Rabindra Sangeet).

List
Famous Baul singers both from Bangladesh and West Bengal include:
 Abdur Rahman Boyati
 Bapi Das Baul
 Basudeb Das Baul
 Bidit Lal Das
 Debu Bhattacharya
 Kangalini Sufia
 Paban Das Baul
 Parvathy Baul
 Saidur Rahman Boyati
 Shah Abdul Karim
 Shyam Sundar Baishnab
 Shushama Das

References

Lists of musicians by genre
Bangladeshi music